Grœnlendinga þáttr refers to two separate tales (þættir) found in Flateyjarbók:

 Grœnlendinga þáttr (I) ('The Tale of the Greenlanders') – Short story about the exploration of Vinland by Leif Erikson and later Norse explorers.
 Grœnlendinga þáttr (II) ('The Tale of the Greenlanders') or Einars þáttr Sokkasonar ('The Tale of Einarr Sokkason') – Short story set in Greenland, concerning Bishop Arnaldr and the fight over a recently deceased merchant's property.